Earle S. Banks (born June 25, 1954) is an American politician, representing the 67th district in the Mississippi House of Representatives since 1993.

Background 
Banks was born in Jackson, Mississippi on June 25, 1954 and attended St. Joseph's High School. After, he earned a Bachelor of Science degree in Accounting from Jackson State University and his Juris Doctor from the Mississippi College School of Law.

Personal life 
He is an unmarried Catholic.

References

External links 
Banks bio at his law firm

1954 births
Living people
Democratic Party members of the Mississippi House of Representatives
Mississippi College School of Law alumni
Mississippi lawyers
American funeral directors
Jackson State University alumni
African-American state legislators in Mississippi
21st-century American politicians
21st-century African-American politicians
20th-century African-American people